Luis M. Farías (7 June 1920 – 3 April 1999) was a Mexican politician affiliated with the PRI who served as Governor of Nuevo León from 1971 to 1973 and Mayor of Monterrey from 1986 to 1988. He served as Deputy of the XLIII, XLVII and LI Legislatures representing the Federal District and Nuevo León.

He was the President of the Chamber of Deputies in 1969 and 1981.

He was an officer of the Legion of Honor (France) and a grand cross of the Order of Merit of the German Republic.

External links
 Los Grandes Gobernadores de Nuevo León. Luis M. Farías, tercera parte

References

1920 births
1999 deaths
Politicians from Monterrey
Presidents of the Chamber of Deputies (Mexico)
Institutional Revolutionary Party politicians
20th-century Mexican politicians
Members of the Chamber of Deputies (Mexico) for Mexico City
Members of the Chamber of Deputies (Mexico) for Nuevo León